The third season of the Reborn! anime series is a compilation of episodes 66 to 73. The third season aired in Japan from January 19, 2008 to March 8, 2008 on TV Tokyo. Titled as Katekyō Hitman Reborn! in Japan, the Japanese television series was directed by Kenichi Imaizumi, and produced and animated by Artland. The plot, based on the Reborn! manga by Akira Amano, follows the life of Tsunayoshi "Tsuna" Sawada, the candidate to be the Mafia boss of the Vongola Famiglia, who must fight against a group of assassins called the Varia who wants to get their leader Xanxus to become the Vongola boss. In order to help Tsuna, some of his friends become guardians for the Vongola to fight the Varia. 

Two pieces of theme music are used for the episodes: one opening theme and one ending theme. The first opening theme is Cherryblossom's "Dive to World" while the ending theme is Lead's "STAND UP!".

Marvelous Entertainment released the season onto two DVD compilations separated into "Daily Chapter" volumes, with each containing a total of four episodes. The Daily Chapter volumes were released on July 25, 2008 and August 29, 2008, and contained episodes 66 to 73. On March 21, 2009, Japan's d-rights production company collaborated with the anime-streaming website called Crunchyroll in order to begin streaming subbed episodes of the Japanese-dubbed series worldwide. New episodes are available to everyone a week after its airing in Japan.


Season 3: 2008

References
General
 
Specific

External links
Official Reborn! website 
TV Tokyo's official anime website 

2008 Japanese television seasons
Season 3